Trevis Aundrell Tedios Jackson (born September 14, 1995) is a Filipino-American professional basketball player for the Blackwater Bossing of the Philippine Basketball Association (PBA).

Professional career
Jackson was drafted fifth overall by the Meralco Bolts during the 2018 PBA draft.

On December 4, 2021, he was traded to the Rain or Shine Elasto Painters for Franky Johnson.

In June 2022 while he was still a free agent, Jackson played 3x3 for Pretty Huge in a regional tournament in Thailand.

On September 20, 2022, Jackson signed with the Blackwater Bossing.

PBA career statistics

As of the end of 2022–23 season

Season-by-season averages

|-
| align=left | 
| align=left |Meralco
| 35 || 11.0 || .375 || .403 || .722 || 1.1 || 1.2 || .3 || .1 || 3.7
|-
| align=left | 
| align=left | Meralco
| 14 || 8.0 || .405 || .353 || .333 || 1.2 || .7 || .1 || .1 || 2.6
|-
| align=left rowspan=2| 
| align=left | Meralco
| rowspan=2|23 || rowspan=2|10.4 || rowspan=2|.341 || rowspan=2|.292 || rowspan=2|.667 || rowspan=2|1.1 || rowspan=2|.7 || rowspan=2|.2 || rowspan=2|.0 || rowspan=2|1.9
|-
| align=left | Rain or Shine
|-
| align=left | 
| align=left | Blackwater
| 12 || 20.1 || .408 || .344 || .800 || 1.8 || 1.2 || .8 || .0 || 6.4
|-class=sortbottom
| align="center" colspan=2 | Career
| 84 || 11.6 || .382 || .364 || .700 || 1.2 || 1.0 || .3 || .1 || 3.4

Personal life
His cousin, DeSean, is an American football wide receiver.

References

External links
PBA.ph profile
Sacramento State Hornets bio

1995 births
Living people
21st-century African-American sportspeople
African-American basketball players
American men's basketball players
American sportspeople of Filipino descent
Basketball players from Santa Monica, California
Blackwater Bossing players
Filipino men's 3x3 basketball players
Filipino men's basketball players
Citizens of the Philippines through descent
Meralco Bolts draft picks
Meralco Bolts players
Point guards
Rain or Shine Elasto Painters players
Sacramento State Hornets men's basketball players
Sportspeople from Sacramento County, California